Major Thomas Lancaster Lansdale (November 10, 1748 – January 19, 1803) was an American soldier who served as an officer in the Continental Army during the Revolutionary War.

Military service

He served in the Continental Army from 1776 through 1783 as an officer in the 3rd Maryland Continental Infantry.

On January 25, 1783, Lansdale was berated in writing by George Washington for the shabby appearance of the troops under his command while encamped on the banks of the Hudson River. Lansdale redeemed himself two weeks later with Washington who then wrote:

At the conclusion of the war, Lansdale was admitted as an original member of the Society of the Cincinnati of Maryland.

Business
Outside of military service, he was a merchant with the firm of Lansdale and Claggett in the port town of Queen Anne and owned a sizeable tobacco plantation in Prince George's County. He made his home at Hazelwood, overlooking Queen Anne.

Family
His father was Isaac Lansdale who died in 1777.  His wife was Cornelia Van Horn Lansdale.

Legacy
His grave in Collington, Maryland (now Bowie) is marked by a municipal park and a boulevard named in his honor.

External links
 
 The Society of the Cincinnati
 The American Revolution Institute

References

Continental Army staff officers
Continental Army officers from Maryland
People of Maryland in the American Revolution
1748 births
1803 deaths